Ch'utu Wankarani (Aymara ch'utu peak of a mountain, top of the head, wankara a kind of drum, ni a suffix to indicate ownership, Hispanicized spelling Choto Huancarani) is a   mountain in the Chilla-Kimsa Chata mountain range in the Andes of Bolivia. It is located in the La Paz Department, Ingavi Province, Jesús de Machaca Municipality, northeast of Ch'ama (Chama). Ch'utu Wankarani lies northeast of Imill Wawani and Apachita and southeast of Jisk'a Sallalla and Wisk'achani. The Wila Jaqhi Jawira ("red rock river", also spelled Wila Jakke Jahuira, Wila Jaqi Jawira) originates near Ch'utu Wankarani. It flows to the northeast.

References 

Mountains of La Paz Department (Bolivia)